John Gast (1715 - 1788) was an Irish Anglican priest and historian.

The son of a French Huguenot, Gast was educated at Trinity College, Dublin. He was the Archdeacon of Glendalough from 1864 to 1878. He also wrote extensively on Irish and Greek history.

References

Alumni of Trinity College Dublin
Archdeacons of Glendalough
1715 births
1788 deaths
18th-century Irish historians